Hjoula is a municipality in the Byblos District of  Keserwan-Jbeil Governorate, Lebanon. It is 70 kilometers north of Beirut. Hjoula has an elevation of between 920 and 1,100 meters above sea level. Hjoula has a total land area of 528 hectares. The village of Hjoula is known for its fertile soil and its woods, as well as Early Cretaceous fossils.

Etymology
The word is an Aramaic one, however the meaning is uncertain. Most historians and linguists suggest it means "Oval" due to its oval shape, while some others speculate it comes from the Syriac root "G-l-a" and subsequently to the word "Guola" which supposedly means "The place of the wandering salesman".

History
Many old relics and monuments were found in Hjoula. There was found a Phoenician inscription in "Jarabta". A Roman statue that represented a shepherd and his sheep was also found beside the lake, and was dated to the era of emperor Tiberius c. 20 CE; along small sets of coins that were written in Kufic with the inscription of Tripoli, resembling the ones used in the Emirate of Tripoli (1079-1109).

After few centuries of the Islamic conquests, the population of mount Lebanon, especially Keserwan, and to a lesser extent, Byblos, was overwhelmingly Shiite in population and a strong dominion of Shiites was present in Keserwan and the fringes of Byblos for five centuries since the start of the 9th century and the rise of the Hamdanids, but it was bound to vanish during 1305 and the Shias were forced leave or adopt the practice of taqiyyah. Hjoula was essentially a Maronite village, inhabited by Abi Khalil family. Of the famous inhabitants was Jibra'el Hjoula, the 104th Maronite patriarch who was killed by the Mamlouks c. 1367 CE in Tripoli.

According to tradition and family legends, the earliest Shiites first inhabited the close town of Annaya before later moving to the interior to Hjoula in the start of the 16th century. Historically, Shiite presence was attested in Hjoula in the 1519 consensus.
Hjoula paid a sizable portion of its income tax towards Aqbay ibn 'Abdallah family vakif; its share rose from 200 g. upon the conquest, to 300 g. during Selim II's reign (1566-1574), to 1,600 g. by the mid-seventeenth century.

Population

The village has a population of around 1900 inhabitants. The village has a population of around 1900 inhabitants. Here's an alphabetical listing of some of the families of Hjoula: Abi Nassif, Abi Raad, Alaa Ad-Din (Shibli), Assaf, Diab, Esber, Hjoula, Hmade, Ibrahim, Issa, Mahdi, Mrad, Nassif, and Qabalan.

Geology
Rock quarries near the village working Cretaceous age marine strata have produced a number of new fish and crustacean species along with rare cephalopods.

References

Populated places in Byblos District
Shia Muslim communities in Lebanon